Eric E. Robertson (born December 6, 1963) is an American law enforcement officer and politician from Washington. Robertson is a Republican member of Washington House of Representatives for District 31. Robertson took office on January 11, 2021.

Early life and education 
On December 6, 1963, Robertson was born in Washington, D.C. to Eugene and Lois (Matthews) Robertson. Robertson grew up in Buckley, Washington. Robertson attended Green River College and City University. In 1985, Robertson graduated from Washington State Patrol Academy. In 1999, Robertson graduated from FBI National Academy.

Career 
In 1983, Robertson was hired by the [(Washington State Patrol)] and in 1985, he became a Trooper for Washington State Patrol.  Robertson attained the rank of Captain, serving Director of the Office of Government & Media Relations and Commander of the Office of Professional Standards, until 2002.

On November 8, 1994, Robertson won the election and became a Republican member of Washington House of Representatives for District 31, Position 1. Robertson defeated Judi Roland with 57.77% of the votes. On November 5, 1996, as an incumbent, Robertson won the election and continued serving Washington House of Representatives for District 31, Position 1. Robertson defeated Darrell Carrier with 64.25% of the votes. On January 3, 1997, Robertson was elected as the House Republican Caucus Chair.

In 2002, Robertson was appointed by President George W. Bush to become the US Marshal for United States Marshals Service for Western Washington. Robertson served as an US Marshal until 2007. In 2007, Robertson became an Administrator for Valley Regional Fire Authority, until retirement in 2018.

On November 3, 2020, Robertson won the election and became a Republican member of Washington House of Representatives for District 31, Position 2. Robertson defeated Thomas R. Clark with 62.98% of the votes.

Awards 
 2006 Director's Honorary Award. Presented by United States Marshals Service Director John Clark.
 2011 Lion of the Year. Presented by Auburn Noon Lions.
 2012 Melvin Jones Fellow Award. Presented by Auburn Noon Lions.
 2018 President's Award. Presented by Washington Fire Chiefs Association.

Personal life 
Robertson's former wife is Carolyn Robertson. They have five adult children. Robertson lives in Sumner, Washington.

References

External links 
 Washington State Legislature Legislative Manual 2021-2022
 Canvass of the Returns of the General Election Held on November 3, 2020
 Eric Robertson at ballotpedia.org
 Eric Robertson at ourcampaigns.com
 Eric Robertson at houserepublicans.wa.gov

1963 births
21st-century American politicians
American police officers
Living people
United States Marshals
People from Sumner, Washington
People from Buckley, Washington
Republican Party members of the Washington House of Representatives